Speyeria hesperis, the northwestern fritillary, is a butterfly of the family Nymphalidae. It is found in the northwestern United States and western Canada, as far east as Manitoba and the Dakotas.

It has bright orange uppersides (yellow in females) and thinner black markings than most fritillaries.

Similar species
Aphrodite fritillary (Speyeria aphrodite)
Atlantis fritillary (Speyeria atlantis)

References

Speyeria
Butterflies of North America
Butterflies described in 1864
Taxa named by William Henry Edwards